Seven flats may refer to:
C-flat major, a major musical key with seven flats
A-flat minor, a minor musical key with seven flats